Brendan Schwab (born 10 March 1968) is an Australian sports administrator, trade union official and lawyer, specialising in labour law, human rights law, collective bargaining and dispute resolution, particularly in professional team sports. On 1 July 2015, he was appointed the Executive Director of the World Players Association, based in Nyon, Switzerland as an autonomous sector of UNI Global Union.

The World Players Association (World Players) represents 85,000 players across professional sport through more than 100 player associations in over 60 countries under the #WorldPlayersUnited strategy. World Players has been particularly active in ensuring the fundamental human rights of the athletes and everyone involved in the delivery of world sport are protected, respected and upheld in accordance with the United Nations Guiding Principles on Business and Human Rights (UNGPs). In particular:

 On 14 December 2017, World Players launched the Universal Declaration of Player Rights, which Schwab was instrumental in drafting. The Declaration contains 17 articles which set out the fundamental rights of players under international human rights law. Signatories to the Declaration include some of the biggest sports unions in the world including FIFPro, the MLBPA, the NBPA, and the NFLPA.
 The Sport and Rights Alliance, which includes World Players, the International Trade Union Confederation, UNI Global Union and NGOs such as Human Rights Watch, Amnesty International, Terres des Hommes and Transparency International Germany, has led discussions with the International Olympic Committee, FIFA and UEFA which have seen the incorporation of human rights standards and the UNGPs into the host city contract for the 2024 Olympic Games, the bidding and staging agreements for the 2024 UEFA EUROs, and the adoption by FIFA of a binding human rights policy.
 The Centre for Sport and Human Rights brings together an unprecedented alliance of intergovernmental institutions, governments, sports bodies, athletes, hosts, sponsors, broadcasters, civil society representatives, trade unions, employers and their associations, and national human rights institutions. The Centre grew out of the work of the Mega Sporting Events Platform, a multi-stakeholder initiative, in which Schwab co-chaired the task force for the people impacted by such events. Launched on 26 June 2018, the Centre works towards a world of sport that fully respects human rights by sharing knowledge, building capacity, and strengthening accountability of all actors through collective action and promotion of the Sporting Chance Principles. World Players, as a founding member, is represented by Schwab on the Centre's advisory council.

Before relocating to Nyon, Schwab served as a Vice President and board member of FIFPro, the world footballers' union based in the Netherlands, which represents an estimated 65 thousand professional footballers. He was also Chairman of FIFPro Asia/Oceania, which represents player associations in Australia, India, Indonesia, Japan, Malaysia, Palestine and New Zealand.

In 2002, he became one of FIFPro's inaugural nominees to the FIFA Dispute Resolution Chamber (DRC) and in 2009 was reappointed to that body for a four-year term. In this role, Schwab regularly attended hearings in Zurich, as part of a panel to adjudicate disputes between professional footballers and clubs. In 2013, he stepped down from the DRC to join the FIFA Players' Status Committee which is charged with making recommendations to the FIFA Executive Committee on regulations that affect professional footballers. He served as one of six player nominees on this Committee until 2016, assisting in introducing reforms to protect players against overdue wages, and developing a FIFA ban on the ownership of player transfer rights by third parties. Schwab worked alongside FIFA Vice President Prince Ali Bin Al-Hussein of Jordan to lift a ban imposed by FIFA on female footballers wearing the hijab during football matches.

In 1993, he co-founded the Australian Professional Footballers' Association (PFA) which represents Australia's elite professional footballers playing in Australia and around the world. He was the long serving Chief Executive and General Counsel of the PFA, overseeing the progression of the PFA and the growth of Australian football over a 20-year period. In 2016, Schwab was appointed as non-executive chairman of the PFA.

In mid 2012, he stepped down as CEO of the PFA and established International Player Relations (IPR), a specialist legal, advocacy and advisory firm, which focused on promoting cooperation and innovation between employees and employers.

Schwab is also a co-founder of the Australian Athletes’ Alliance (AAA), and was the chief architect of the body's charter of athletes rights. AAA represents eight player unions and over 3,500 athletes in sports such as AFL, basketball, rugby union, rugby league, cricket, netball, horse racing (jockeys) and, of course, football. He acted as the AAA’s part-time General Secretary from 2009 until June 2015.

Since 1992, he has forged a close professional relationship with Braham Dabscheck, Australia's leading academic on the industrial relations aspects of professional team sports. In 1998, they undertook an organisational review of the AFL Players' Association which transformed that body. In 2012, they assisted the Rugby League Players' Association in the negotiation of a new five year collective bargaining agreement following the sport's record broadcast rights agreement.

Schwab has also held non-executive positions on the Board of an industry super fund, the peak body for Australia's symphony orchestras and has been a director and Vice President of the AFL Club Richmond. He has also held senior positions in the entertainment industry including as CEO of Live Performance Australia from 2003 - 2006 and represented media and entertainment employers at the International Labor Organisation in Geneva in 2004.

He is a vocal campaigner in media circles often sought for comment on football matters, broader athlete issues such as drugs in sport, match fixing, industrial relations and player welfare and development. He provided evidence before Senate Hearings into ASADA in 2013 and Australian soccer in 1995 and is a regular presenter at industry conferences and sports law seminars. In February 2013, he was a guest speaker at the FIFA/Interpol Conference on Match Fixing in Malaysia. In 2015, Schwab spoke on the role of organised athletes in promoting the good governance of sport at the prestigious Play the Game conference in Denmark and at FIFPro's legal legends conference in Amsterdam. In 2016, he presented on the importance of athlete unionisation in world sport at the fall symposium on corruption in sport conducted by the Maryland Journal of International Law at the University of Maryland. He is presently addressing the importance of embedding internationally recognised human rights of athletes and others involved in the delivery of sport.

Schwab holds a Bachelor of Laws and Master of Business Administration. He is married with four children. He is the son of the late Alan Schwab, who was a prominent sports administrator and VFL commissioner, and the brother of Cameron Schwab, who is the former chief executive officer of the Melbourne Football Club.

References

Australian soccer chairmen and investors
Richmond Football Club administrators
Association football executives
1968 births
Living people
Australian chief executives
Australian sports executives and administrators